Sir Thomas Lawley, 1st Baronet (died 19 October 1646) was an English politician who sat in the House of Commons between 1625 and 1629.

Lawley was the son of Francis Lawley of Spoonhill near Much Wenlock, Shropshire and his wife Elizabeth Newport, daughter of Sir Richard Newport. Lawley succeeded to the estate at Spoonhill on the death of his brother in 1623. He was a member of the Worshipful Company of Drapers. In 1625, he was elected Member of Parliament for Wenlock. He was re-elected MP for Wenlock in 1626 and in 1628 and sat until 1629 when King Charles decided to rule without parliament for eleven years.

Lawley acquired the estate of Twickenham Meadows in 1638. In 1639, he was elected Sheriff of London, but never served. He was elected an alderman of the City of London for Castle Baynard ward in 1641.  He was created baronet of Spoonhill, Shropshire, on 14  August 1641. He was Master of the Drapers Company for 1642 to 1643.

Lawley married Anne Manning. Lawley was succeeded in the baronetcy by his son Francis. His widow married John Glynne.

References

Year of birth missing
1646 deaths
Baronets in the Baronetage of England
English MPs 1625
English MPs 1626
English MPs 1628–1629
Politicians from Shropshire
Aldermen of the City of London
Sheriffs of the City of London